Loreburn is a village in the Canadian province of Saskatchewan within the Rural Municipality of Loreburn No. 254 and Census Division No. 11.

Loreburn is home of The 19ers Hockey Club, a Senior Hockey team that competes in the Sask Valley Hockey League (SVHL). They won championships in 1998 & 2000. The 19ers play out of the Loreburn Arena (rink), located at 419 Jamieson St, Loreburn, Sk. The Loreburn Arena is known to be one of if not the coldest, indoor hockey rink in the world.

History 
Loreburn incorporated as a village on May 20, 1909.

The hardcover book by the title of, “From Mouldboard to Metric” is a history of the Village of Loreburn published in 1978 and is available from the Lorburn Village Office for $65.00 (as of 2022).

Demographics 

See also 

 List of communities in Saskatchewan
 Villages of Saskatchewan

Events

Loreburn has many community events year-round, including pancake breakfasts, seed exchanges in Spring, special event fundraisers and other small group gatherings.
The arena hosts many sports and community provisions throughout the year.

See also 
https://villageofloreburn.ca/news-events/

Amenities

Loreburn has an RV Campground (established 2019) that features 12 sites, fully serviced (power, water and sewer hookup) and a new washroom facility with two fully wheelchair accessible bathrooms/showers.

A gas station, credit union, Canada Post office, insurance broker are within the village along with a few other small to mid-size businesses.
The RM of Loreburn No.254 office and (new as of 2021) depot is located at the east side entrance of the village.

References

External links

Villages in Saskatchewan
Loreburn No. 254, Saskatchewan
Division No. 11, Saskatchewan